Robert Taylor (c. 1682–1723) was an Irish Member of Parliament.

Biography
The son of Robert Taylor of Ballynort and brother of Berkeley Taylor, he sat in the Irish House of Commons for Askeaton from 1703 to 1714 and for Tralee from 1715 to his death, when he was succeeded by William Sprigge. In 1706 he was High Sheriff of County Limerick.

References

1680s births
1723 deaths
High Sheriffs of County Limerick
Irish MPs 1703–1713
Irish MPs 1713–1714
Irish MPs 1715–1727
Whig (British political party) MPs for Irish constituencies
Members of the Parliament of Ireland (pre-1801) for County Limerick constituencies
Members of the Parliament of Ireland (pre-1801) for County Kerry constituencies